"Bring Me to Life" is the debut single by American rock band Evanescence from their debut studio album, Fallen (2003). Wind-up released it as the album's lead single on April 7, 2003. The song was written by Amy Lee when she was 19, after an exchange with an acquaintance during a time she was in relationship turmoil; the song is about having been desensitized and realizing all the things she had been missing in life. Guitarist Ben Moody and David Hodges also have songwriting credits on the song, which features guest vocals from Paul McCoy of the band 12 Stones. Produced by Dave Fortman, "Bring Me to Life" is a nu metal and goth metal crossover song. The male vocal rap was forced by the label against Lee's wishes, in order to market it in the musical landscape of the time.

The critical response to the song was generally positive, with critics praising its melody and Lee's vocals. Following its inclusion in a scene of the film Daredevil and its soundtrack, "Bring Me to Life" became a commercial success, topping the charts in Australia, the UK, and Italy, and charting in the top ten of over 15 countries, including the US, Argentina, Germany, and New Zealand. The song's lyrics were initially interpreted by some to be religious, which led it to chart on the Christian rock charts. "Bring Me to Life" was certified triple-platinum in 2019 by the Recording Industry Association of America (RIAA).

"Bring Me to Life" won the Grammy Award for Best Hard Rock Performance at the 46th Grammy Awards, where it was also nominated for Best Rock Song. Directed by Philipp Stölzl, the accompanying music video shows Lee singing and climbing on a skyscraper while having nightmares in her room. "Bring Me to Life" became one of the band's most commercially successful songs. It served as the official theme song for WWE's 2003 No Way Out event. The song was re-arranged and re-recorded for Evanescence's orchestral-electronica fourth studio album, Synthesis (2017).

Composition and recording 
Lee wrote "Bring Me To Life" at age 19, after a then-acquaintance looked her "dead in the eye" and asked her if she was happy; Lee was in an abusive relationship at the time and in turmoil, and was shocked the person saw through her facade as she felt she "was completely outwardly acting normal". "I felt like he could just see straight into my soul. That inspired the whole song", she explained. Lee later confirmed that person was Josh Hartzler, a therapist who became a close friend and she married in 2007. The song is about "open-mindedness", Lee said. "It's about waking up to all the things you've been missing for so long." After the moment that inspired her to write the song, Lee "realized that for months I'd been numb, just going through the motions of life." Lee said that she generally writes songs alone first on the piano or on acoustic guitar, and for Fallen she would write a song and work with Moody to "take it to the finish line." Moody and David Hodges also share writing credits on the track. In 2004, Lee expressed that the making of Fallen was stressful because "we had to remember at least one big single had to be totally radio-friendly. And I'm really ready not to think that way."

Recording work for Fallen began at Ocean Studios in Burbank, California, where most of "Bring Me to Life" was recorded, prior to full album production. The song was mixed by Jay Baumgardner in his studio, NRG Recording Studios in North Hollywood, on an SSL 9000 J. A 22-piece string section was recorded in Seattle by Mark Curry. "Bring Me to Life" was mixed at the Newman Scoring Stage and Bolero Studios, both in Los Angeles. David Campbell provided the song's strings, an "expense" Lee fought for.

"Bring Me to Life" is stylistically a nu metal-rap rock song, which Lee disliked as the label forced them to add the male rapping vocal to make it marketable, or the song and the album would not be released. During an interview, Lee stated: "It was presented to me as, 'You're a girl singing in a rock band, there's nothing else like that out there, nobody's going to listen to you. You need a guy to come in and sing back-up for it to be successful.'" Lee wrote Paul McCoy's part. On the chorus, Lee sings the lines "'Call my name and save me from the dark' over "surging guitars", and McCoy raps the lines "Wake me up/ I can't wake up/ Save me!". According to the sheet music published by Alfred Music Publishing on the website Musicnotes.com, the song is set in common time and performed in a moderate tempo of 95 beats per minute. It is written in the key of E minor and Lee's vocal range for the song runs from the low note of A3 to the high note of D5.

Rolling Stones Kirk Miller said that the song is stylistically a "case of mistaken identity", dooming the band to Linkin Park comparisons "thanks to [its] digital beats, clean metal-guitar riffs, scattered piano lines and all-too-familiar mix of rapping and singing." Blair R. Fischer of MTV called it a "ubiquitous rap-rock confection". Richard Harrington from The Washington Post described its sound as "crunching metallic". Ann Powers from the Milwaukee Journal Sentinel said that "with its lyrical drama and crunchy guitars, [the song] branded the band as overdone nu-metal." "Bring Me To Life" has also been classified as hard rock, alternative rock, and Blender writer Nick Catucci described it as a "crossover goth-metal smash". Nick Catucci of The Village Voice wrote that "piano tinkles, Lee's breathless keen, dramatic pauses, guitars like clouds of locusts, [and] McCoy's passing-12-kidney-stones guest vocals" characterize the song, which "sounds like church-burning, brain-eating European dark metal." Vik Bansal of musicOMH said the track contains "Lee's temptress vocals, pseudo-electronic beats à la Linkin Park, understated but menacing metallic riffs in the background, and a ripping, radio-friendly rock chorus." MTV described it as "an unrelenting paean that begins as hauntingly delicate before piling on crumpled guitar lines and a rap" while "Lee's vocals soar above the whole sludgy mixture".

Release 
"Bring Me to Life" first appeared in a scene of the film Daredevil and was included on the film's soundtrack, released in February 2003. The song was released as Fallens first single on April 7, 2003. Wind-up Entertainment president Ed Vetri revealed that when the label first introduced the song to radio, radio programmers rejected it, saying, "A chick and a piano? Are you kidding? On rock radio?" A female voice on rock radio was a rarity, and the song was considered for airplay only after there was a male vocal on it. After the song was released on the Daredevil soundtrack, listeners began demanding air play for it. On the worldwide success of the song, Lee said: 

The single includes "Farther Away" as a B-side. The first pressing of the Australian single contained the track "Missing" as a B-side, but this was omitted from later pressings and later released as a bonus track on the band's first live album, Anywhere but Home. An acoustic version was recorded and released on the "Bring Me to Life" DVD. Several other versions of the track have been released, such as remixes, acoustic and altered versions.

Reception and accolades 
AllMusic's Johnny Loftus called the song "misleading" due to the vocal duet but "flawless". Kelefa Sanneh of The New York Times said that "Bring Me to Life" "floats like a butterfly, stings like a bee and then hits like a brick." Writing for Milwaukee Journal Sentinel, Ann Powers wrote that it is a "mix of voluptuous singing and metallic guitar (the latter enhanced by McCoy's rap-rock declamations)". Joe D'Angelo of MTV said the song is an "unrelenting paean that begins as hauntingly delicate before piling on crumpled guitar lines and a rap" and Lee's "vocals soar above the whole sludgy mixture to keep it from sinking into tired mediocrity." Adrien Bengrad from PopMatters called it a "quality single" although hearing it more led him to find it "nothing more than a bombastic distraction from the usual dreck" despite "the refreshing dose of melody". Christopher Gray of The Austin Chronicle deemed it "one of the more curious offerings to be had on the airwaves right now and lingers in the memory like the remnants of a particularly vivid nightmare".

Bryan Reeseman of Mix described "Bring Me to Life" as "grandiose and moody". Nick Catucci of The Village Voice deemed it a "fabulous breakthrough single" that sounds like "church-burning, brain-eating European dark metal." John Hood of the Miami New Times said it is a "huge, heavy, and mightily histrionic" track that pits Lee's "soaring voice both with and against the rap-infused gruff of McCoy". In his review of Evanescence's second album, Don Kaye of Blabbermouth.net criticized the song for containing "annoying faux-rapping" as a "key component". Melissa Maerz of Spin said that Lee thematically tackles death on the song with "grandeur". Rolling Stone called it "haunting, moody and cinematic".

"Bring Me to Life" won the Grammy Award for Best Hard Rock Performance at the 46th Grammy Awards, where it was also nominated in the category Best Rock Song. At the 2003 MTV Video Music Awards the band was nominated in the category for Best New Artist for "Bring Me to Life". The song received a nomination at the 2003 MTV Europe Music Awards for Best Song. At the 14th annual Billboard Music Awards, it won the award for Soundtrack Single of the Year. "Bring Me to Life" ranked number 69 on VH1's 100 Greatest Songs of the 2000s.

Chart performance 
"Bring Me to Life" peaked within the top 10 of more than 15 countries, and within the top 20 of several other countries, making it the band's most successful single to date. It was certified Platinum in 2003 for selling more than one million copies in the United States. It topped the Billboard Alternative Songs and Pop 100 charts and peaked at number five on the Billboard Hot 100. It also peaked at number four on the Adult Pop Songs chart. The song initially peaked within the Christian rock charts as well, because its lyrics were interpreted as a call for new life in Jesus Christ by several listeners. "Bring Me To Life" charted at number 73 on Billboards Best of the 2000s Rock Songs Chart, the only song by a female-led band on that chart. The song topped the charts of Australia, Belgium, Italy and the United Kingdom. It peaked within the top 5 of Austria, Canada, France, Ireland, Germany, New Zealand, Norway, Netherlands, and Sweden. On the ARIA Singles Chart, "Bring Me to Life" peaked at number one where it stayed for six weeks.

"Bring Me to Life" charted within the top 20 of every other country of its release.
In the United Kingdom, the song spent four weeks at the top of the UK Singles Chart, which in turn  helped Fallen peak at the top of the UK Albums Chart. The song also topped the European Hot 100 chart. On June 4, 2011, the song returned to the top of the UK Rock & Metal Singles Chart, eight years after its original release, remaining at number one for two weeks, on June 11, 2011, to June 25, 2011. It fell to number two, remaining there for three weeks, and on July 17, 2011, "Bring Me to Life" returned to number one again and remained there for three weeks. The song remained within the top 10 into October 2011. , the song has sold more than 745,000 copies in the United Kingdom.

Music video 
The accompanying music video for "Bring Me to Life" was directed by Philipp Stölzl.  Talking about the video, Stölzl said: "On the one hand, it brings out the most catchy part of the song, the bridge, the duet with the male and female vocals. On the other hand, it reflects the  soundtrack background of the song. I did not know if I would have to use a stunt double for most of the angles, which would have restricted me a lot, but then it turned out that Amy did everything herself, hanging on Paul's arm for hours without getting tired. In the end, she is the one who made that shot strong."

On February 1, 2022, the video for "Bring Me to Life" surpassed 1 billion views on YouTube, becoming the first Evanescence song to reach this milestone. As of October 2022, the music video has over 1.1 billion views on YouTube.

According to Joe D'Angelo of MTV News, Lee's "teetering on a ledge" in the video shows a "distressed and emotionally wrought heroine." MTV's Gil Kaufman described the scenes of the video: "Lee dreams that she has super Spidey powers, climbs up the outside of a building, spies on her creepy neighbors, then plunges into the abyss." Corey Moss of MTV felt that "as intense as a superhero movie, the sequence also gives a nice visual to the song's most memorable lyric, 'Save me.'" John Hood of Miami New Times wrote that the "gothopolis backdrop" in the video "would make Tim Burton green with envy". Ann Powers from the Milwaukee Journal Sentinel wrote: "You might not immediately recognize Amy Lee's name, but you would know her if she plummeted past you from the top floor of a tenement building." The music video was nominated at the 2003 MTV Video Music Awards for Best Rock Video, but lost to Linkin Park's "Somewhere I Belong".

Live performances 
A live performance from the Fallen tour filmed at Le Zénith in Paris is included on Evanescence's live album and concert DVD Anywhere but Home  (2004). The live recording contains a piano and vocal solo before the song's intro. McCoy's studio vocals were performed by tour guitarist John LeCompt during the tour. 

Evanescence performed the song at their August 17, 2011 concert in Nashville, Tennessee during the tour of their third album, Evanescence (2011). They also performed it at the Rock in Rio festival on October 2, 2011. On February 16, 2020, Lee performed the song with Japanese band Wagakki Band at Osaka-jō Hall, in Osaka, Japan.

2017 Synthesis arrangement 

In 2017, a rearranged version of the song was recorded for the band's fourth studio album Synthesis. The new version was made available for digital download and streaming on August 18, 2017; it was also made available for instant download for concertgoers who purchased tickets for the band's Synthesis Tour. The Synthesis version of "Bring Me to Life" replaces the drums and guitar from the Fallen version with string arrangements accompanied by crashing cymbals, "tension-building" timpani drums and various electronic elements throughout. It also removes Paul McCoy's vocal feature. Several critics have described its new arrangement as "dramatic", with Billboards Sadie Bell deeming it "just as rich" as the original and Rolling Stones Brittany Spanos calling it a "cinematic take". Lee has described the song as "new" to her again due to the fact that she incorporated musical elements and vocals which she had "heard in [her] head" since its release.

Credits and personnel 
Credits are adapted from Fallen liner notes.
Amy Lee – writing, keyboards, vocals
Ben Moody – writing, guitar
David Hodges – writing, keyboards
Josh Freese – drums
Francesco DiCosmo – bass guitar
David Campbell – string arrangements
Graeme Revell – orchestral conduction
Paul McCoy – guest vocals 
Dave Fortman – producing

Track listings 

 European CD single
 "Bring Me to Life" – 3:56
 "Bring Me to Life" (Bliss Mix) – 3:59

 European maxi-CD
 "Bring Me to Life" – 3:56
 "Bring Me to Life" (Bliss Mix) – 3:59
 "Farther Away" – 3:58
 "Bring Me to Life" (music video) – 4:14

 Australian CD single
 "Bring Me to Life" – 3:56
 "Bring Me to Life" (Bliss Mix) – 3:59
 "Farther Away" – 3:58
 "Missing" – 4:15

 French CD single
 "Bring Me to Life" – 3:56
 "Bring Me to Life" (Bliss Mix) – 3:59

 Subsequent pressings single
 "Bring Me to Life" – 3:56
 "Bring Me to Life" (Bliss Mix) – 3:59
 "Farther Away" – 3:58
 "Bring Me to Life" (music video) – 4:14

 International DVD
 "Bring Me to Life" (video)
 "Bring Me to Life"
 "Bring Me to Life" (live acoustic version)
 "My Immortal" (Live acoustic version)
 Interview footage

 UK cassette single
 "Bring Me to Life" – 3:56
 "Farther Away" – 3:58
 "Bring Me to Life" (Bliss Mix) – 3:59

Charts

Weekly charts

Year-end charts

Decade-end charts

All-time charts

Certifications and sales

Release history

Katherine Jenkins cover 

Welsh classical singer Katherine Jenkins recorded a cover version of "Bring Me to Life" on her 2009 album Believe. Jenkins said: "I'd mentioned that I wanted to try Evanescence's Bring Me to Life and David [Foster] said 'you can't sing that'. I came out there questioning my vocal abilities. I'm just not used to being told that. I went home that night and I just thought to myself 'you have to pull yourself together, he's worked with so many incredible artists you have to step up the plate.' I did talk myself round and I went in there the next day on a mission. It's good to be pushed sometimes – and I proved him wrong!" Jenkins decided to change the  guitar-led and percussive original version and instead, "make it more orchestral with the percussion coming from the strings." Alfred Hickling of The Guardian gave a mixed review of Jenkins' cover, calling it "histrionic." However, a writer of BBC Online chose her version of the song as a highlight on the album. On October 23, 2009, the song was available for digital download as the second single from Believe. On November 23, 2011, Jenkins sang the song live at the Leicester Square station in London.

Track listing

Weekly charts

See also 
 List of number-one singles of 2003 (Australia)
 List of number-one hits of 2003 (Italy)
 List of UK Singles Chart number ones of the 2000s
 List of Billboard number-one alternative singles of the 2000s
 List of Billboard Mainstream Top 40 number-one songs of 2003
 List of UK Rock Chart number-one singles of 2003
 List of UK Rock Chart number-one singles of 2011

References 

Daredevil (film series)
2000s ballads
Evanescence songs
2003 debut singles
2002 songs
Number-one singles in Australia
European Hot 100 Singles number-one singles
Number-one singles in Italy
Number-one singles in Scotland
Number-one singles in Spain
UK Singles Chart number-one singles
Songs written by Ben Moody
Songs written by David Hodges
Songs written by Amy Lee
Grammy Award for Best Hard Rock Performance
American alternative rock songs
Gothic metal songs
Rap rock songs
Wind-up Records singles
Epic Records singles
Katherine Jenkins songs